Yuval Pick, born in 1970 in Israel, is a choreographer and the director of the National Choreographic Center (Centre Chorégraphique National) of Rillieux-la-Pape (France).

Biography 

Appointed director of the National Choreographic Center of Rillieux-la-Pape in France in August 2011, Yuval Pick has a long career as a choreographer, a dancer and a teacher.

He first trained at the Bat-Dor Dance school in Tel Aviv, then joined the Batsheva Dance Company in 1991. Four years later he left to begin working as an international guest artist with, among others, Tero Saarinen, Carolyn Carlson and Russel Maliphant.

In 1999 he joined the Opera Ballet of Lyon, and founded his own company, The Guests, in 2002. Since then he has created a strong repertory of works marked by their elaborated, layered movement vocabulary, accompanied by commissioned scores by ranking composers.

In his work the relationships between individuals and group(s) are often highlighted and challenged. He created Popular Music (2005), Strand Behind (2006) for the Agora Festival of IRCAM and the Junior Ballet of the National Conservatory of music and dance in Lyon, /Paon/ (2008) for the Junior Ballet of Geneva and17 drops. In 2010, he created Score, then The Him for the Junior Ballet of the National Conservatory of music and dance in Paris and the trio PlayBach at the invitation of Carolyn Carlson. In 2012, No play hero, around the music of David Lang and Folks for the "Biennale de la Danse" in Lyon. The, two creations in 2014, the duet loom around the music of Nico Muhly and Ply for 5 dancers with the American composer Ashley Fure. In 2015 he created Apnée (corps vocal) for 4 dancers and 6 singers in collaboration with Spirito, "les Chœurs et solistes de Lyon — Bernard Tétu".

Main choreographies 
1997 : Kvedim, which won a prize at the Gvanim Festival of Tel Aviv
1998 : Nice for a White Wedding
2002 : solo Cotton Crown for the Venice Biennale
2004 : Le Sacre for the Ballet de Lorraine
2005 : Popular Music
2006 : Strand Behind
2007 : Look White Inside
2008 : 17 Drops
2008 : solo Living in Pieces for the Biennale de la danse de Lyon
2008 : /Paon/ for the Junior Ballet of Genève
2010 : Score
2010 : PlayBach
2012 : No Play Hero
2012 : Folks
2014 : loom
2014 : Ply
2015 : Apnée (corps vocal)
2015 : eddies
2015 : Are Friends Electric?

References

External links 
 Website of the Centre chorégraphique national of Rillieux-la-Pape

Israeli choreographers
Israeli emigrants to France
Israeli Jews
1970 births
Living people